Richard James Ryall (born 26 November 1959 in Harare) is a former South African first class cricketer. He served as a wicketkeeper for Western Province for over a decade and took over 400 first class dismissals and 200 One Day dismissals.

References

External links
Cricinfo

1959 births
Living people
South African cricketers
Western Province cricketers
Wicket-keepers